Malamir Knoll (Malamirova Mogila \ma-la-'mi-ro-va mo-'gi-la\) rises to 200 m in the southeast extremity of the Dryanovo Heights, Greenwich Island in the South Shetland Islands, Antarctica. It has precipitous and ice-free southwest slopes and was named after the Bulgarian ruler Khan Malamir, 831-836 AD.

Maps
 L.L. Ivanov et al. Antarctica: Livingston Island and Greenwich Island, South Shetland Islands. Scale 1:100000 topographic map. Sofia: Antarctic Place-names Commission of Bulgaria, 2005.
 L.L. Ivanov. Antarctica: Livingston Island and Greenwich, Robert, Snow and Smith Islands. Scale 1:120000 topographic map.  Troyan: Manfred Wörner Foundation, 2009.

References
 Malamir Knoll. SCAR Composite Antarctic Gazetteer
 Bulgarian Antarctic Gazetteer. Antarctic Place-names Commission. (details in Bulgarian, basic data in English)

External links
 Malamir Knoll. Copernix satellite image

Hills of Greenwich Island